Wielbark may refer to:

Wielbark culture, part of an Iron Age archaeological complex in northern Europe
Wielbark, Pomeranian Voivodeship, a village in northern Poland
Wielbark, Warmian-Masurian Voivodeship, a village in north-east Poland
Gmina Wielbark, a rural administrative district in Warmian-Masurian Voivodeship

See also
Vidivarii, archeological culture related to Wielbark culture
Willenberg (disambiguation)